Elizabeth Carnegy-Arbuthnott (4 February 1906 – 24 January 1985) was a British fencer. She competed at the 1936 and 1948 Summer Olympics.

She was president of the Soroptimist International of London Mayfair in 1969–70.

References

External links
 
 

1906 births
1985 deaths
British female fencers
Olympic fencers of Great Britain
Fencers at the 1936 Summer Olympics
Fencers at the 1948 Summer Olympics
Sportspeople from Kensington